Tilaunchi is a village in Kanpur Dehat district in the state of Uttar Pradesh, India.

Transport

Tilaunchi Railway Station is on the railway line connecting Jhansi with Kanpur. 
Jhansi-Lucknow Passenger and Jhansi-Kanpur Passenger are among the main trains that pass through this station. 
To the west is Lalpur Railway Station, the nearest station. Going east, Paman Railway Station is the station next to Tilaunchi. Kanpur Central Railway Station is the nearest major railway station. The Station Code is: TLNH.

Demographics

As of 2001 India census, Tilaunchi had a population of 1,458. Males constitute 54% of the population and females 46%.

Geography

Tilaunchi is located at 26°20'29"N 80°1'25"E.

Villages in Kanpur Dehat district